Alex Carder (born October 22, 1989) is an American football quarterback for the West Michigan Ironmen of American Arena League. He was signed as a free agent by the Detroit Lions of the National Football League.  He was formerly the starting quarterback at Western Michigan University.

Early years
Carder was born in Springfield, Missouri in 1989.  He attended Shawnee Mission Northwest High School in Shawnee, Kansas where he was selected as an All-Sunflower League player three consecutive seasons.  He passed for 3,457 yards and rushed for another 524 yards as the quarterback for SMNW's football team.  He also received two varsity letters in baseball and one in basketball.

College career
Carder was the backup quarterback as a redshirt freshman in 2009 and the starting quarterback in the 2010 through 2012 seasons.  As a sophomore in 2010, Carder completed 289 of 458 passes for 3,334 yards, 30 touchdowns and 12 interceptions.

As a junior in 2011, he gained 3,940 yards of total offense on 3,434 passing yards and 253 rushing yards.  He ranked eighth among all players in the NCAA Football Bowl Subdivision with 335.18 yards of total offense per game.  In November 2011, Carder was responsible for eight touchdowns (seven passing and one rushing) in a 66–63 loss to the Toledo Rockets.  His seven passing touchdowns against Toledo set a new Mid-American Conference (MAC) record, and his 548 passing yards in the game set a new Western Michigan record.  He was selected as a finalist for the 2011 FRS QB Performance of the Year.

Carder's senior season was derailed when he sustained an injury in his throwing hand against Connecticut, though he was able to come back to play the final two games of the season.

Statistics

Source:

Professional career
Carder was rated the 20th best quarterback in the 2013 NFL Draft by NFLDraftScout.com. His NFL.com Draft profile states that "If teams are willing to look past his senior season, and if Carder performs well enough in the postseason process, he could be a late-round pick."

Detroit Lions
After going undrafted in the 2013 NFL Draft, Carder was signed on April 27 as an unrestricted free agent by the Detroit Lions. He was released May 29.

Iowa Barnstormers
On February 5, 2014, Carder was assigned to the Iowa Barnstormers of the Arena Football League. Carder was placed on league suspension on March 12, 2014.

Nashville Venom
Carder was allowed to sign with the Nashville Venom of the Professional Indoor Football League (PIFL) on March 12, 2014, when the Barnstormers placed him on league suspension. After leading the Venom to a 3–0 start, Carder was placed on the AFL-Exempt list by the Venom.

Jacksonville Sharks
On April 24, 2014, Carder was assigned to the Jacksonville Sharks. After playing in parts of 3 games, and completing 2 of 3 passes for 19 yards, Carder was placed on other league exempt on June 9, 2014.

Ottawa Redblacks
Once placed on the other league exempt list by the Sharks, Carder signed with the Ottawa Redblacks of the Canadian Football League (CFL). Carder did not see any playing time in his first season in the CFL. Carder was released on May 1, 2015.

Portland Thunder
On May 25, 2015, Carder was traded to the Portland Thunder for claim order positioning.

West Michigan Ironmen
In 2016, Carder signed with the West Michigan Ironmen. On February 23, 2017, he re-signed with the Ironmen. He played in 12 games for the Ironmen in 2017, completing 169 of 282 passes for 1,845 yards, 30 touchdowns and 12 interceptions. He earned First-team All-Northern Conference honors.

Guangzhou Power
Carder was selected by the Guangzhou Power in the nineteenth round of the 2016 CAFL Draft and was the backup to J. J. Raterink during the 2016 season. Carder also served as the team's placekicker.

AFL statistics

Stats from ArenaFan:

References

External links
 WMU biography
 Ottawa RedBlacks bio

1989 births
Living people
Sportspeople from Springfield, Missouri
Players of American football from Kansas
American football quarterbacks
Western Michigan Broncos football players
Iowa Barnstormers players
Nashville Venom players
Jacksonville Sharks players
Ottawa Redblacks players
Portland Thunder players
West Michigan Ironmen players
Guangzhou Power players
Detroit Lions players